Woodlands is an unincorporated community in the Rural Municipality of Woodlands in the Interlake Region of Manitoba, Canada.

Woodlands was named by D. Porteus, for the surrounding lands to the north, west and east which are wooded. The post office was established in 1874.

Environment Canada's weather radar station that serves the Winnipeg area is located in Woodlands. Woodlands is also home to the Woodlands Pioneer Museum.

References

External links 

 Weather Radar - Woodlands, Manitoba

Unincorporated communities in Interlake Region, Manitoba